Veličković (Cyrillic script: Величковић) is a Serbian patronymic surname derived from a masculine given name Veličko. It may refer to:

People with the surname 
Dušan Veličković, Serbian writer, journalist and filmmaker
Jasna Veličković (born 1974), composer living in the Netherlands since 2001
Nenad Veličković (born 1962), prose writer and playwright from Bosnia and Herzegovina
Novica Veličković (born 1986), Serbian professional basketball player
Vladimir Veličković (1935–2019), one of the most prominent Serbian painters
Vladimir Veličković (born 1989), Serbian professional basketball player
Vukša Veličković (born 1979), Serbian writer, journalist and cultural critic

Serbian surnames

Patronymic surnames